Italian singer-songwriter Nina Zilli has released four studio albums, an extended play and sixteen singles. She released her debut extended play, Nina Zilli, in September 2009. It peaked at number 54 on the Italian Albums Chart. The EP includes the singles "50mila" and "L'inferno". She released her debut studio album, Sempre lontano, in February 2010. It peaked at number 5 on the Italian Albums Chart. The album includes the singles "L'uomo che amava le donne" and "Bacio d'a(d)dio". She released her second studio album, L'amore è femmina, in 15 February 2012. It peaked at number 11 on the Italian Albums Chart. The album includes the singles "Per sempre", "L'amore è femmina", "Per le strade" and "Una notte". Zilli was chosen to represent Italy in the Eurovision Song Contest 2012 in Baku, Azerbaijan, where she placed 9th with the song "L'amore è femmina (Out of Love)". She released her third studio album, Frasi & fumo, in February 2015. It peaked at number 15 on the Italian Albums Chart. The album includes the singles "Sola" and "#RLL (Riprenditi le lacrime)". She released her fourth studio album, Modern Art, in September 2017. It peaked at number 17 on the Italian Albums Chart. The album includes the singles "Mi hai fatto fare tardi", "Domani arriverà (Modern Art)", "Senza appartenere", "1xUnattimo" and "Ti amo mi uccidi".

Albums

Extended plays

Singles

As lead artist

As featured artist

Music videos

References

Zilli, Nina